Beaming In is the second album by American comedian Chris Rush. The album was released in 1981 on City Sounds, which is a subsidiary of MMO Music Group Inc. 25 years after the initial release it was re-released through the online record label, Laugh, onto CD and digital download.

Track listing

Side one
 Mutant Blues
 End of the World Funnies
 The Missile Silo (The Missile Silo) (1984)
 Fun City
 Bambi Basher
 Grass (Too High) (Reefer Madness) (Good Ship Lollipop) (Sucking The Bosco Pump)
 Beaming In
 Aliens (Exchange Student From Alpha Centauri) (Close Encounters) (Pet Human)
 Chariot of the Gods

Side two
 Sky Lab
 Farts in Space
 Son of Future Shock
 Test Tube Baby
 Computer Bummer
 Monkey Party
 Dolphins
 Cave Man Love
 Amityville Horror
 Bermuda Triangle
 10,000 Lb. Goober
 Star Trek II
 Living Together

Personnel
Steve Prinias – Engineer
Malcome Addey - Engineering consultant
Joe Barbaria – Mix engineer, editing engineer
David Prentice – Editing engineer
Jeff Schwartz – Personal management, Production manager
Michael Sullivan – Cover art
Hal Wilson – Art direction
Peter Bramley – Special thanks
Marlene Hollick – Special thanks
Howard Leibowitz – Special thanks
Jamie Rich – Special thanks
Michael Shevlin – Special thanks
Alan Siegel – Special thanks
Aura-Sonic Ltd. – Location recording

References

1981 albums
Chris Rush albums
1980s comedy albums
Albums recorded at the Bitter End